The Jean-Nickolaus Tretter Collection in Gay, Lesbian, Bisexual and Transgender Studies is a collection of LGBT historical materials housed in the Special Collections and Rare Books section of the University of Minnesota Libraries. It is located underground in the Elmer L. Andersen special collections facilities on the University of Minnesota's Minneapolis campus. The Tretter Collection houses over 40,000 items, making it the largest LGBT archive in the Upper Midwest and one of the largest GLBT history collections in the United States.  The collection, which was created by Jean-Nickolaus Tretter, is international in scope and is varied in media.

Collection 
Although books are the core of the collection (including a large holding of gay pulp fiction), substantial sections include textiles, glassware, film, music, art works, and three-dimensional objects such as statuary, event buttons, and furniture.  The collection includes unpublished manuscripts, vertical files, and periodicals in approximately 56 languages.  Much of the material is from people and organizations in  the United States during the last third of the twentieth century.

Among the significant archival holdings are:
 items from the Magnus Hirschfeld estate
 archives of the national Log Cabin Republicans
 records of the Daughters of Bilitis
 Mattachine Society records
 page proofs and layouts for six works by Andy Warhol
 archives of the National Education Association GLBT Caucus
 the personal papers of:
 Tobias Schneebaum
 Charles Nolte
 Stuart Ferguson

The collection was started by Jean-Nickolaus Tretter, a Minnesota-born archivist, in the 1950s, and donated to the University of Minnesota Libraries in the early 200s when the collection grew large enough to be a fire hazard in his home.

Selected items from the collection and timelines are frequently assembled and displayed worldwide. Recent displays have been at the Motor City Pride in Michigan in 2007 and 2009, and the first Moscow Pride festival in May 2006.

In 2005, the collection started its official newsletter, The Tretter Letter.

In 2006, The Tretter Collection, the University of Minnesota Libraries, and the Quatrefoil Library presented the first GLBT ALMS (Archives, Libraries, Museums and Special Collections) Conference in Minneapolis.

It is the home of the Transgender Oral History Project, which has gathered 200 video interviews of transgender individuals, primarily in the Upper Midwest, and which has received funding for a second phase.

Awards, honors and media recognition 
In 2016, The Jean-Nickolaus Tretter Collection was the inaugural recipient of the Newlen-Symons Award for Excellence in Library Services and Outreach to the GLBT Community.

"The Newlen-Symons Award recognizes the tremendous impact of the Tretter Collection and its leadership in collecting and preserving the record of the GLBT community, from the University of Minnesota campus and beyond," said American Library Association President Sari Feldman. "Through preservation, collection development and advocacy, the Tretter Collection embodies how libraries can transform lives and communities."

In 2017, The Tretter Collection won the Diversity Award presented by the Society of American Archivists. The Society of American Archivists annually recognizes outstanding contributions, leaders, and achievers in advancing diversity within the archives profession. Tretter was honored for its dedication to filling in the gaps of the GLBT archival record and for striving to include marginalized voices from within the GLBT community.

People 
In 2015, Andrea Jenkins began work at the Tretter Collection as curator of the Transgender Oral History Project.

See also 
 Libraries and the LGBTQ community
 Transgender Oral History Project (separate project with same name as the project at Tretter)

References

External links
 University Tretter Collection website
 Andersen Library Website

Archives in the United States
LGBT museums and archives
LGBT studies organizations
University of Minnesota
2000 establishments in Minnesota